The mitosenes are a class of organic chemicals based on a quinone-containing three-ring structure related to the two-ring core of the indolequinones. They are derived from the mitomycins by reduction and are the active alkylating agents responsible for the antitumor activity of the mitomycins.

References 

Quinones
DNA replication inhibitors
Enones